Skime is an unincorporated community in Reine Township, Roseau County, Minnesota, United States.

Notes

Unincorporated communities in Roseau County, Minnesota
Unincorporated communities in Minnesota